Tactical Vest Antenna System (TVAS) is a type of wearable antenna designed for use by the United States Armed Forces. It is claimed that troops equipped with the TVAS are more effective than traditional whip antenna-equipped troops due to better concealment of the equipment and mobility improvement to the operator. TVAS was developed by Wearable Antenna Technologies Inc. in early 2008.

Implementation
The Tactical Vest Antenna System is designed to be concealed within Small Arms Protective Insert pouches found on contemporary body armor such as Interceptor body armor, Modular Tactical Vest, Full Spectrum Battle Equipment, Combat Integrated Releasable Armor System, Modular Body Armor Vest and virtually any other type of body armor that utilizes SAPI or ESAPI plates. Hiding away the radiating elements brings more mobility to the operator when compared to whip antennas traditionally used by the military. TVAS is compatible with AN/PRC-148 MBITR, AN/PRC-152, and other common radios used by the U.S. military.

Safety
If power is increased over 7 watts there could be safety issues with temperature increase. However, at the operating frequencies of the antenna, ionizing radiation is not a factor.  Additionally, the antenna is intended to be placed on the outside of SAPI plates, providing a significant barrier between the radiating element and the operator.

Technical details
The Tactical Vest Antenna System consists of two radiating elements that are connected by a cable.  The cable acts as an extension of the radiating elements, and includes a "quick release" mechanism found in MTV and FSBE designs.   Each of the radiating elements of the antenna is laminated between two sheets of polycarbonate plastic.

See also
 Joint Electronics Type Designation System (JETDS) - unclassified designation system for identifying electronic equipment
 SINCGARS - Combat net radio 30 to 88 MHz
 AN/PRC-148 - handheld multiband, tactical software-defined radio 30 to 512 MHz
 AN/PRC-152 - portable, compact, tactical software-defined combat-net radio 30 to 512 MHz

References

Military electronics of the United States
Military radio systems of the United States
Military equipment introduced in the 2000s